Daniel Cappelletti (born 9 October 1991) is an Italian footballer who plays as a defender for Italian Serie C club Vicenza .

Cappelletti started his early career as a full-back, but transformed into centre-back with Südtirol.

Biography
Born in Cantù, Lombardy, Cappelletti started his career at Como and then Cantù San Paolo. In January 2009 he was signed by Sicily club Palermo. He was a regular member of Primavera under-20 team in 2009–10 season.

In August 2010 he left for Serie B club Padova along with Davide Succi, with option to buy half of the registration rights for €400,000 and €500,000 respectively. Cappelletti made his debut on 2 October, replacing José Ángel Crespo at half time. That season he played 3 games in the Italian second division, substituted Crespo twice and left-back Trevor Trevisan once. He made his only start in 2010–11 Coppa Italia. That match Padova used a 3–4–3 formation and he was one of the 3 defenders.

On 1 July 2011, he left for another second division club Sassuolo along with Karim Laribi. However, he did not play any match for the first match but played for Sassuolo's Primavera (literally "Spring") team as overage player. On 5 January 2012, he moved to fellow second division club Juve Stabia.

On 13 July 2012, Palermo agreed a loan deal with Lega Pro Prima Divisione club South Tyrol, where he was a centre-back. On 11 July the temporary deal was renewed.

On 4 July 2019, he signed a 2-year contract with Vicenza.

Representative team
Cappelletti was selected by Lombardy regional "student" team for 2007 Coppa Nazionale Primavera, a tournament compete by representative teams of Italian regions. The team finished as the second in the Group 3 and eliminated. He did not get any international caps until spotted by Italy under-21 Serie B representative team in 2011, where he played as a left-back against Serbian First League Selection twice and Russian First League Selection once.

References

External links
 Football.it Profile 
 Lega Serie B Profile 
 

1991 births
Sportspeople from the Province of Como
Living people
Italian footballers
Association football defenders
Como 1907 players
Palermo F.C. players
Calcio Padova players
U.S. Sassuolo Calcio players
S.S. Juve Stabia players
A.S. Cittadella players
L.R. Vicenza players
Serie B players
Serie C players
Footballers from Lombardy